is a Japanese actor and writer.  He was born on August 15, 1959 in Tokyo, Japan.  As a writer, he uses the pen name Ryō Kajiwara (梶原 涼).

Anime roles
Transformers: Car Robot: Gigatron/DevilGigatron
Yu-Gi-Oh! Duel Monsters: Akhenamkhanen

External links
Shinjuku Ryozan Puku profile

Japanese male voice actors
1959 births
Living people
Male voice actors from Tokyo